The men's (outdoor) singles was one of six lawn tennis events on the Tennis at the 1908 Summer Olympics programme. The tournament was played on grass courts at the All England Lawn Tennis and Croquet Club. There were 31 competitors from 9 nations. Nations could enter up to 12 players. The event was won by Major Ritchie of Great Britain, the nation's third victory in four Games. Otto Froitzheim earned Germany's first medal in the event with his silver. Another Briton, Wilberforce Eaves, took bronze.

Background

This was the fourth appearance of the men's singles tennis. The event has been held at every Summer Olympics where tennis has been on the program: from 1896 to 1924 and then from 1988 to the current program. Demonstration events were held in 1968 and 1984. In 1908, for the first time of two, an indoor version was held concurrently.

The top players did not compete in this event. Arthur Gore played only in the indoor event. William Larned, Norman Brookes, Anthony Wilding, and Laurence Doherty were noted absences. Major Ritchie was a solid player, having gone deep into Wimbledon multiple times but never having won in singles (he took doubles titles in 1908 and 1910 with Wilding).

Austria, Bohemia, Canada, the Netherlands, and South Africa each made their debut in the event. France, Germany, and Great Britain each made their third appearance, tied for most among all nations.

Competition format

The competition was a single-elimination tournament. For the first time at the Olympics, a bronze medal match was played. All matches were best-of-five sets.

Schedule

The schedule was impacted by rain, with matches adjourned overnight on occasion.

The Olympics started three days after the end of the 1908 Wimbledon Championships, a scheduling issue which the Official Report recommended avoiding in the future.

Draw

Finals

Top half

Section 1

Section 2

Bottom half

Section 3

Section 4

Results summary

References

External links
 
  ITF, 2008 Olympic Tennis Event Media Guide

Men's outdoor singles
Men's events at the 1908 Summer Olympics